Heads We Go (U.S. title: The Charming Deceiver) is a 1933 British comedy film directed by Monty Banks and starring Constance Cummings, Frank Lawton and Binnie Barnes. It was made at Elstree Studios by British International Pictures.

The film's sets were designed by Duncan Sutherland.

Plot
Finding herself mistaken for Hollywood star Dorothy Kay (Constance Cummings), impoverished model Betty Smith (also Cummings) poses as the actress in a cracked scheme by newspaper heir (Frank Lawton) that goes farcically awry.

Cast

Critical reception
Allmovie dismissed the film as a "tired quota quickie"; whereas British Pictures noted a "Brisk romantic comedy of misunderstandings. The supporting cast do well, but this is Constance Cummings' film all the way. She's effortlessly glamorous  and watchable."

References

Bibliography
 Low, Rachael. Filmmaking in 1930s Britain. George Allen & Unwin, 1985.
 Wood, Linda. British Films, 1927-1939. British Film Institute, 1986.

External links

1933 films
British comedy films
1933 comedy films
1930s English-language films
Films shot at British International Pictures Studios
Films directed by Monty Banks
Films set in London
Films set in France
Seafaring films
British black-and-white films
1930s British films